Chiang Chih-chung is a Taiwanese javelin thrower. He is Chinese Taipei's most successful representative at the Paralympic Games, having won two gold medals, in 2000 and 2004. He competes in the F13 category for athletes with visual disabilities.  He set a world record at the Sydney Games with a throw of 57.28 metres, before setting a new world record in Athens with a throw of 59.38 metres.

At the International Blind Sports Federation World Championships and Games in Brazil in 2007, Chiang won a gold medal in the javelin, silver in the discus and bronze in shot put. As of January 2008, he had won seven gold medals in international competitions.

In 2004, Chiang was awarded the Order of Brilliant Star with Cravat in recognition of his Paralympic performances.

He was due to represent Chinese Taipei again at the 2008 Summer Paralympics in Beijing, but was barred from attending by the International Paralympic Committee. The Taipei Times reported that no reason was given for the ban, even after the Chinese Taipei Paralympic Committee had requested an explanation from the IPC. A representative of the CTPC stated that the People's Republic of China may have "interfered for political reasons" to prevent Chiang from participating in the Games. The Taipei Times article was subsequently reproduced on the Taiwanese government's website.

Chiang is an Aboriginal Taiwanese, of the Bunun people, and originates from Kaohsiung County. He developed a severe visual impairment after getting cement residue and sweat in his eyes while working on a construction site. He was subsequently diagnosed with near-total vision loss.

References

External links
 Picture: Chiang at the Republic of China's 93rd National Day celebrations, in 2004

External links
 

Paralympic athletes of Chinese Taipei
Athletes (track and field) at the 2000 Summer Paralympics
Athletes (track and field) at the 2004 Summer Paralympics
Athletes (track and field) at the 2012 Summer Paralympics
Paralympic gold medalists for Chinese Taipei
Bunun people
Living people
Sportspeople from Kaohsiung
Medalists at the 2000 Summer Paralympics
Medalists at the 2004 Summer Paralympics
Year of birth missing (living people)
Paralympic medalists in athletics (track and field)
Taiwanese male javelin throwers
Visually impaired javelin throwers
Paralympic javelin throwers
Medalists at the 2010 Asian Para Games
Medalists at the 2014 Asian Para Games